Georgi Ilkov Terziev (born on 18 April 1992) is a Bulgarian professional footballer currently playing as a defender for Ludogorets Razgrad.

Career

Early career
Terziev started his football career in his home town at Sliven. He later moved to Naftex Burgas's youth system. Terziev eventually made his debut for the senior squad, aged 15, in a match against Haskovo on 8 March 2008. He ended the season with a total of nine appearances. In April 2008, he went on a trial at English club Newcastle United. He played with their youth team during the trial, eventually failing to impress.

Chernomorets Burgas

In July 2009, Terziev signed a five-year deal with city rivals Chernomorets Burgas, as Naftex Burgas experienced financial troubles. On 29 August, he made his debut in a 3–0 win against Sportist Svoge.

Ludogorets Razgrad
On 12 August 2013, Terziev signed with Ludogorets Razgrad on a four-year deal for a reported fee of €500,000. He was given the number 55 jersey.

Terziev made his debut in a 4–0 home win against Slavia Sofia on 2 November, coming on as an 82nd-minute substitute for Cosmin Moți. On 14 November, he made his first start in a 2–1 Bulgarian Cup win over Beroe Stara Zagora, playing full 90 minutes in the centre of defence. Terziev then made his full A Group debut for Ludogorets on 1 December, partnering Alexandre Barthe for the full 90 minutes in a 1–0 away win against Beroe. On 12 December, he made his Europa League debut, playing the full 90 minutes in a 2–1 win over  Dinamo Zagreb at Maksimir.

Terziev scored his first goal in the Champions League group phase on 26 November 2014, grabbing a 2–2 equalizer against Liverpool in the 88th minute, in an eventual 2–2 draw.

On 12 February 2016 he extended his contract with Ludogorets until 2019, after his contract was to end in the summer of 2016.

On 15 February 2017, Terziev was loaned to Croatian club Hajduk Split until the end of the season.

International career
On 7 October 2011, Terziev earned his first cap for Bulgaria in the 0–3 away loss against Ukraine in an exhibition match.

Career statistics

Clubs

Honours

Club 
Ludogorets
 Bulgarian First League (9): 2013–14, 2014–15, 2015–16, 2016–17, 2017–18, 2018–19, 2019–20, 2020–21, 2021–22
 Bulgarian Cup: 2013–14
 Bulgarian Supercup (5): 2014, 2018, 2019, 2021, 2022

References

External links
 

1992 births
Living people
Bulgarian footballers
Bulgaria international footballers
Bulgaria under-21 international footballers
Bulgaria youth international footballers
Association football defenders
Neftochimic Burgas players
PFC Chernomorets Burgas players
PFC Ludogorets Razgrad players
PFC Ludogorets Razgrad II players
HNK Hajduk Split players
First Professional Football League (Bulgaria) players
Second Professional Football League (Bulgaria) players
Croatian Football League players
Bulgarian expatriate footballers
Expatriate footballers in Croatia
Sportspeople from Sliven